The Fagatele Bay Site is an archaeological site on the shore of Fagatele Bay on the south side of Tutuila, the main island of the United States territory of American Samoa.  The site shows evidence of habitation from prehistoric to historic times, and is well preserved in part because of the relative difficulty of land access to the area.  It has ten distinct features, including raised platforms, stone walls, and a stone-line path.  In one feature, interpreted as a house site, a complete prehistoric-era adze was found.  When surveyed in 1985, these features could not be chronologically organized or correlated.

The site was listed on the National Register of Historic Places in 1997.

See also
National Register of Historic Places listings in American Samoa

References

Tutuila
Archaeological sites on the National Register of Historic Places in American Samoa